David Neil Santee (born July 22, 1957 in Oak Park, Illinois) is an American former competitive figure skater. He finished fourth in the 1980 Winter Olympics in Lake Placid, and is the 1981 World silver medalist and an eight-time U.S. national medalist. He competed at the Winter Olympics twice. Santee cited the movie “Rocky” as an inspiration and often skated to its theme music, earning himself the nickname “Rocky on Ice.”

His younger brother James Santee was also an elite-level skater.

David was inducted to both the U.S. Figure Skating and ISI Hall of Fame in 2015. He achieved the PSA Master Coach's rating in 2017.

Santee is an ISU Technical Specialist. He also works as a coach. He coached Agnes Zawadzki for seven years as a child and again since June 2011. He is currently the Director of Skating at the Oakton Ice Arena in his hometown of Park Ridge, Illinois. He has served on the ISI Board of Directors as the Instructors Rep for many years and is ISI's representative to the US Figure Skating Board of Directors.

He has two sons, Chris and Michael.

Results

References

1957 births
American male single skaters
Figure skaters at the 1976 Winter Olympics
Figure skaters at the 1980 Winter Olympics
American figure skating coaches
International Skating Union technical specialists
Olympic figure skaters of the United States
Living people
Sportspeople from Park Ridge, Illinois
World Figure Skating Championships medalists